Agility PR Solutions (formerly MediaMiser ) is a provider of media monitoring and analysis software and professional services for public relations and marketing professionals. Agility PR Solutions uses proprietary technology to monitor, aggregate, analyze and share content from more than 200,000 sources across social, traditional and digital media to provide detailed analysis reports and daily briefings to its customers, which include several Fortune 500 companies as well as small- and medium-sized businesses.

In July 2014, Innodata Inc. (NASDAQ: INOD), an American company that provides business process, technology and consulting services, acquired Agility (then MediaMiser).

In December 2014, MediaMiser acquired intellectual property and related assets of Bulldog Reporter, a PR company providing PR industry newsletters, journalist databases, media intelligence and a PR awards program entitled Bulldog Awards.

References

External links
 Agility PR Solutions website
 MediaMiser Garners $1M in Growth Capital Financing
 MediaMiser to Launch Twitter Functionality to its Media Analysis Software
 Fastest Growing Companies: MediaMiser

Companies based in Ottawa
Media analysis organizations and websites
Companies established in 2003
2003 establishments in Canada